John Joseph Monaghan (21 August 1918 – 3 March 1984) was a world flyweight boxing champion from Belfast. He became famous in the post-war period, eventually rising to become undisputed world champion and a hero to many people in his home city.

Boxing career
Born in Lancaster Street in North Belfast, Monaghan attended St Patrick's Christian Brothers' School in Donegall St. A noted fighter at boys' level, he entered the paid ranks in his mid-teens. After a short absence for wartime service, Monaghan resumed his career and his burgeoning reputation drew huge crowds from all parts of his home city. In particular, bouts at Belfast's King's Hall were the highlight with that venue normally packed to the rafters.

In October 1947, the National Boxing Association world crown became his after outpointing the American, Dado Marino at Harringay Stadium for the vacant title. The mantle of undisputed champion of the world rested on his shoulders after his defeat of the tough Scottish fighter Jackie Paterson by knock-out in the King's Hall on 23 March 1948. Paterson was to prove one of the Belfast man's major adversaries.

In April 1949 he retained his World title, and became European champion, by dispatching Frenchman Maurice Sandeyron.

His final fight came in September 1949 when he drew with Londoner Terry Allen. By the time that a long-standing chest complaint forced his retirement as champion in 1950, Monaghan's trophy-cabinet contained the British, European, Commonwealth and World crowns. Of the 66 official bouts he fought during his successful career, he lost only nine and drew six. Monaghan endeared himself to his supporters after his fights by singing When Irish Eyes are Smiling to the King's Hall audience, which joined in the singing.

Life outside boxing
A part-time cabaret artist, Monaghan toured western Europe during World War II with other notables of the period, including Vera Lynn, Gracie Fields and George Formby, and later formed his own band.

His nickname "Rinty" came from his fondness for dogs. According to his daughter Martha, he brought
home injured dogs so often that his grandmother called him Rin Tin Tin, after the film dog, and shortened it to Rinty.

Monaghan married Frances Thompson in 1938 and moved to the nearby district of "Little Italy", close to Sailortown. He had three daughters, Martha, Rosetta and Collette, and one son, Sean. The money Monaghan had made from boxing did not set him up for a comfortable retirement, and he had to work in a variety of jobs. But he remained true to his working-class roots and stayed in Belfast. Monaghan died at his home in Little Corporation St on 3 March 1984, at the relatively young age of 65. He is buried in Belfast City Cemetery.

To mark the influence of this "home-town hero", the Ulster History Circle and Belfast City Council provided a plaque in his honour at the King's Hall. It was unveiled, in the presence of many of his family circle and friends, on 3 May 2007.

Belfast City Council erected a statue to Monaghan at Cathedral Gardens on 20 August 2015. Designed by Alan Beattie Herriot, this 10-foot high bronze statue on a granite plinth features Monaghan holding a microphone and singing "When Irish Eyes are Smiling".

Professional boxing record

See also
List of flyweight boxing champions
List of British flyweight boxing champions

References

External links

Rinty Monaghan - CBZ Profile

Further reading
Eamonn O'Hara, Rinty: the story of a champion (Belfast, 2008)

1918 births
1984 deaths
Boxers from Belfast
Male boxers from Northern Ireland
Burials at Belfast City Cemetery
Irish male boxers
Flyweight boxers